Sergey Filippov (1912 – 1990) was a Russian actor

Sergei Filippov may also refer to:

 Sergei Filippov (footballer, born 1892), Russian football player
 Sergei Filippov (footballer, born 1967), Russian football player